Luis Colosio Fernández (2 March 1923 – 6 February 2010) was a Mexican politician affiliated with the Institutional Revolutionary Party (PRI). He served as Senator of the LVIII and LIX Legislatures of the Mexican Congress representing Sonora, as well as the municipal president of Magdalena de Kino.

He was father of Luis Donaldo Colosio, presidential candidate of the PRI in the 1994 election who was murdered on 23 March 1994.

References

1923 births
2010 deaths
Politicians from Sonora
Members of the Senate of the Republic (Mexico)
Municipal presidents in Sonora
Institutional Revolutionary Party politicians
20th-century Mexican politicians
21st-century Mexican politicians
People from Magdalena de Kino